The Final Riot! is the second official live album by American rock band Paramore and was released on November 25, 2008, with a bonus DVD containing the full live concert plus behind-the-scenes footage.

The DVD was filmed on August 12, 2008, at the Congress Theater in Chicago on The Final Riot! Summer Tour. It contains a documentary entitled "40 Days of Riot!", showing the band on tour. It is available in a standard and limited deluxe edition, which includes a 36-color-page booklet of the tour, along with another documentary, 40 MORE Days of Riot!.

Track listing

Personnel
Hayley Williams – lead vocals, keyboards
Josh Farro – lead guitar, backing vocals, bass guitar on "We Are Broken"
Jeremy Davis – bass guitar, drums on "We Are Broken"
Zac Farro – drums, percussion
Taylor York – rhythm guitar, glockenspiel on "We Are Broken"

Charts

Certifications

Release history

References

Paramore live albums
2008 live albums
Fueled by Ramen live albums